Dídac Vilà Rosselló (born 9 June 1989) is a Spanish professional footballer who plays as a left-back.

Club career

Espanyol
Born in Mataró, Barcelona, Catalonia, Vilà joined local RCD Espanyol's youth system at the age of 10, making his senior debut in 2008–09 and helping the reserves promote from the Tercera División, as champions. He was promoted to the first team by manager Mauricio Pochettino, making his La Liga debut on 30 January 2010 in a 1–0 home win against Athletic Bilbao (which, in his own words, came as a "surprise") and ending his first professional season with 11 league games, starting and playing all the minutes in every match as the Pericos finished in mid-table. Previously, he appeared with the main squad in the 2008 final of the Copa Catalunya, lost 2–1 to UE Sant Andreu, and signed a five-year contract with the club shortly after.

After missing the first months of the 2010–11 campaign due to physical problems, Vilà once again gained first-choice status, taking over longtime incumbent – and fellow youth graduate – David García.

Milan
On 28 January 2011, Vilà was bought by A.C. Milan in Serie A for a reported €3 million. After only one official appearance for the Italians (the 0–0 draw away to Udinese Calcio for the Serie A), and subsequently being highly critical of coach Massimiliano Allegri, he returned to Espanyol in early June 2011 in a season-long loan. He only missed one match during the league campaign, scoring twice but in as many away losses.

Vilà was set to join Valencia CF on loan at the beginning of 2012–13 with the option of making the move permanent at the end of the season, but the deal fell apart as he did not pass the required medical exams. Subsequently, the player underwent surgery, failing to play in a competitive match for the Rossoneri.

For the 2013–14 campaign, Vilà moved to Real Betis on loan, again being bothered by physical problems – including a leg fracture. After the Andalusians' relegation he subsequently returned to Milan, and joined SD Eibar on 26 August 2014 also in a temporary deal. After fully recovering he suffered a thigh injury, going on to feature in 16 games in all competitions.

AEK Athens
On 7 August 2015, AEK Athens F.C. announced the signing of Vilà on a three-year deal, with the player stating he hoped this move would see him return to his old form. He played understudy to Aristidis Soiledis during the first part of the season but eventually became the starter, impressing manager Gus Poyet for his professionalism in training.

Vilà started 2016–17's domestic league with a goal, contributing to a 4–1 home victory over Xanthi FC.

Espanyol return
On 30 August 2017, Vilà returned to his first club Espanyol after agreeing to a three-year deal, with a €25 million buy-out clause.

International career
In 2011, Vilà received his first Spain under-21 call-up. That year, he was selected by manager Luis Milla to the UEFA European Championship in Denmark, playing all the matches and minutes for the eventual champions.

Career statistics

Club

Honours
Espanyol B
Tercera División: 2008–09

Milan
Serie A: 2010–11

AEK
Greek Football Cup: 2015–16

Espanyol
Segunda División: 2020–21

Spain U21
UEFA European Under-21 Championship: 2011

Spain U20
Mediterranean Games: 2009

References

External links

1989 births
Living people
People from Mataró
Sportspeople from the Province of Barcelona
Spanish footballers
Footballers from Catalonia
Association football defenders
La Liga players
Segunda División players
Segunda División B players
Tercera División players
CE Mataró players
RCD Espanyol B footballers
RCD Espanyol footballers
Real Betis players
SD Eibar footballers
Serie A players
A.C. Milan players
Super League Greece players
AEK Athens F.C. players
Spain youth international footballers
Spain under-21 international footballers
Spain under-23 international footballers
Competitors at the 2009 Mediterranean Games
Mediterranean Games medalists in football
Mediterranean Games gold medalists for Spain
Catalonia international footballers
Spanish expatriate footballers
Expatriate footballers in Italy
Expatriate footballers in Greece
Spanish expatriate sportspeople in Italy
Spanish expatriate sportspeople in Greece